The 1981 season of the Venezuelan Primera División, the top category of Venezuelan football, was played by 12 teams. The national champions were Deportivo Táchira.

Results

First stage

Semifinals

Group A

Group B

Final Stage

External links
Venezuela 1981 season at RSSSF

Ven
Venezuelan Primera División seasons
Prim